The Cathedral of St. Brendan, Loughrea, is the cathedral church of the Roman Catholic Diocese of Clonfert. Though designed in neo-gothic style, it  arguably houses the most extensive collection of arts and crafts and Celtic Revival artifacts of any single building in Ireland. Its most noteworthy feature is the extensive collection of stained glass windows by the Dublin-based An Túr Gloine studio. There are also twenty-four embroidered banners, mostly depicting Irish saints as well as vestments by the Dun Emer Guild. Sculptors represented are John Hughes (sculptor) and Michael Shortall, and the architect William Alphonsus Scott also contributed designs for metalwork and woodwork. The foundation stone was laid on 10 October 1897 and the structure was completed in 1902; most of the interior features date from the first decade on the twentieth century with the exception of the stained glass windows which continued to be commissioned up until the 1950s.

The origins of An Túr Gloine and that of the cathedral's decorative scheme are inextricably connected. Among the studio's first orders were three apse windows, in 1903, for the new cathedral and virtually all of the studio's artists such as Michael Healy (artist), Alfred E. Child, Sarah Purser, Beatrice Elvery, Ethel Rhind, Hubert McGoldrick, Catherine Amelia O'Brien and Evie Hone are represented. There are ten windows by Michael Healy, including the first one he both designed and executed, St Simeon, and also one of his undisputed finest, The Last Judgement completed in 1940, a year before he died.

References

External links
 Official Website
 Tourist Website

Roman Catholic cathedrals in the Republic of Ireland
Roman Catholic Diocese of Clonfert
Roman Catholic churches completed in 1902
Religion in County Galway
20th-century Roman Catholic church buildings in Ireland
20th-century churches in the Republic of Ireland